Sant Jordi de ses Salines is a small village in the south  of the Spanish island of Ibiza. The village is in the municipality of Sant Josep de sa Talaia and is located close to the islands main Airport and straddles the designated road PM-802.

References

Populated places in Ibiza